Christianity is a minority in Fujian province of China. The Shouters are present in the province. Churches in Fujian include The Aowei Church of Holy Rosary, Church of Heavenly Peace, Fuzhou, Flower Lane Church, Saint Dominic's Cathedral, Fuzhou and St. John's Church, Fuzhou. Christianity in Fuqing consisted of 350,000 Christians in the 2000s and is a centre of Christianity. The local churches (affiliation) are estimated to include about half of them. 
The number of members of the Three-Self Patriotic Movement in Fujian is a high 6-digit figure at least. 
 
There are at least 80,000 members of the True Jesus Church in the province. Fujian has many house churches.
Christianity has been present in Fujian for centuries.  The People's Republic of China has 
persecution of Christians. Unregistered Catholics are controlled tightly in the province. A house church in Pingtan in Fujian province was demolished in 2006.

Roman Catholic dioceses with seat in Fujian
Roman Catholic Archdiocese of Fuzhou
Roman Catholic Diocese of Tingzhou
Roman Catholic Diocese of Xiamen

See also
Chinese Rites controversy
Early western influence in Fujian
Christianity in Fujian's neighbouring provinces
Christianity in Guangdong
Christianity in Jiangxi
Christianity in Zhejiang
:Category:Christian missionaries in Fujian

References